Roland is a masculine Frankish given name that is also used as a family name. Forms in other languages include: Orlando (Italian), Rolando (Italian, Portuguese, Spanish), Roldán (Spanish).

Origin
The name Roland originates from Frankish.  Its meaning has usually been identified as "famous land," "from the famous land," or "fame of the land", derived from the stems "Hrōð" or "χrōþi" meaning fame, and "land" (Hrōþiland). Some claim that "land" was derived from "nand," meaning "brave.",

The name became widespread after the semi-legendary military hero Roland who served in the Frankish army under Charlemagne circa 778 A.D. and whose exploits were celebrated in the Chanson de Roland or Song of Roland.

Variations include "Rollo" in British English and "Rolle" in Scandinavian languages.

Given name
Roland (bishop of Treviso) (fl. 1073–1089), Italian prelate
Roland of Cremona (1178–1259), Italian Dominican friar and theologian
Roland of Sicily (1296–1361), Sicilian nobleman and general

A–E
Roland Bäckman (born 1960), Swedish politician
Roland Bailey, American football cornerback known as "Champ"
Roland Barthes (1915–1980), French literary critic and theorist
Roland Borsa (died 1301), voivode of Transylvania for 3 periods in the late 13th century
Roland Burris (born 1937), American politician
Roland Butcher, Barbados born English cricketer
Roland Van Campenhout (born 1944), Flemish blues musician
Roland Chaplain, English author and senior lecturer
Roland Clark (born 1965), American house music DJ, producer, songwriter and vocalist
Roland Cziurlock (born 1967), German bodybuilder
Roland Desné (1931–2020), French writer
Roland Dumas (born 1922), French Socialist politician and lawyer who served as Foreign Minister from 1984 to 1986 and from 1988 to 1993 and President of the Constitutional Council of France from 1995 to 1999
Roland Ekenberg (born 1957), Swedish Army major general
Roland Emmerich (born 1955), German film director, screenwriter, and producer, United States' 11th-highest-grossing director of all time
Roland Étienne (born 1944), French archaeologist

F–M
Roland Freisler (1893–1945), jurist and judge of Nazi Germany, State Secretary of the Reich Ministry of Justice, and President of the People's Court
Roland of Galloway (d. 1200), Norse-Gaelic king of Galloway
Roland Garros (aviator) (1888–1918), French aviator
Roland Gibbs (1921–2004), British military officer
Roland Gift (born 1961), British singer
Roland Grapow (born 1959), German heavy metal guitarist
Roland Harrah III (1973–1995), American actor
Roland Hattenberger (born 1948), Austrian footballer
Roland Joffe (born 1945), British film director
Roland Kaiser (born 1952), German singer 
Roland Kirk (a.k.a. Rahsaan Roland Kirk, 1935–1977), American jazz musician
Roland Koch (born 1958), German politician
Roland Kun (born 1970), Nauruan politician
Roland Michener (1900–1991), Canadian politician, Governor General of Canada

N–Z
Roland Orzabal (born 1961), English musician, songwriter and record producer
Roland Penrose (1900–1984), British surrealist artist and poet
Roland Pope (1864–1952), Australian cricketer and ophthalmologist
Roland I Rátót (died 1277 or 1278), Hungarian influential lord
Roland II Rátót (died 1301), Hungarian baron
Roland III Rátót (died 1336), Hungarian baron
Roland Ratzenberger (1960–1994), Austrian racing driver
Roland Rotherham, British historian and lecturer
Roland the Farter, 12th century jester
Roland Stephen Tennekoon, Sri Lankan Sinhala politician, elected member of the State Council of Ceylon
Roland Topor (1938–1997), French illustrator and writer
Roland Evelyn Turnbull (1905–1960), British colonial administrator
Roland Varga (footballer) (born 1990), Hungarian footballer
Roland Wlodyka (1938–2020),  NASCAR Cup Series driver
Roland Wohlfarth (born 1963), German footballer
Roland Woolsey (born 1953), American football cornerback
Saint Roland (died 1200), French abbot
 Roland Tan, Singaporean gangster and fugitive wanted for murder

Surname 
Blessed Nicolas Roland  (1642–1678), Catholic priest
Dean Roland (born 1972), American musician
Dennis Roland (born 1983), American football player
Ed Roland (born 1963), American musician
Edwin J. Roland (1905–1985), American Coast Guard commandant
Floyd Roland (born 1961), Canadian politician
Gene Roland (1921-1981), American jazz composer and musician
Gérard Roland (footballer) (born 1981), French football player
Gilbert Roland (1905–1994), American actor
Hans Roland (born 1931), Australian author and teacher
Ida Roland (1881–1951), Austrian actress
Jean-Marie Roland (1734–1793), French politician, leader of the Girondist faction in the French Revolution
Joe Roland (1920–2009), American jazz musician
John Roland (born 1941), American journalist
Johnny Roland (born 1943), American football player
Madame Roland (1754–1793), wife of Jean-Marie
Pauline Roland (1805-1852), French feminist
Pierre Roland (born 1979), Indonesian actor
Ruth Roland (1892–1937), American actress
Seth Roland (born 1957), American soccer player and coach
Walter Roland (1902–1972), American blues, boogie-woogie and jazz musician

Variations
 Rolando
 Roldán
 Role
 Roli
 Rolie
 Rolin
 Rolo
 Rolon
 Rolly
 Rolo
 Rowland
 Rowlands

See also
 Roland (disambiguation)
Orlando (given name)
Rowland (given name)
Rowland (surname)
Robert
Rodrick (disambiguation)
Rudolph
Roger
Rowlandson
Roland (game character)

References

Dutch masculine given names
English given names
Estonian masculine given names
French masculine given names
German masculine given names
Scandinavian masculine given names
English masculine given names